Gonars is a town and comune near Palmanova in  Friuli, northeastern Italy.

History

World War II

On 23 February 1942, the fascist regime established a concentration camp in the town, mostly for prisoners from present-day Slovenia and Croatia. The first transport of 5343 internees (1643 of whom were children) arrived two days later from the Province of Ljubljana and from the Rab camp and the camp in Monigo near Treviso.

The camp was disbanded on 8 September 1943, immediately after Italian capitulation. Every effort was made to erase any evidence of this black spot of Italian history. The camp's buildings were destroyed, the materials were used to build a nearby kindergarten and the site was turned into a meadow. Only in 1973 a sacrarium was created by sculptor Miodrag Živković at the town's cemetery. Remains of 453 Slovenian and Croatian victims were transferred into its two underground crypts. It is believed that at least 50 additional persons died in the camp due to starvation and torture. Apart from the sacrarium, no other evidence of the camp remains and even many locals are unaware of it.

Among the people interned in the camp were scientist Aleš Strojnik, writer Vitomil Zupan, poets Alojz Gradnik and France Balantič, historians Bogo Grafenauer and Vasilij Melik, sculptor Jakob Savinšek, playwright and essayist Bojan Štih, journalist Ernest Petrin, and politicians Anton Vratuša, Boris Kraigher and France Bučar.

Twin cities
  Vrhnika, Slovenia

Further reading
 Alessandra Kersevan, Un campo di concentramento fascista. Gonars 1942-1943., Kappa Vu Edizioni, Udine, 2003

References

External links
Official site of the concentration camp Memorial
An article from Romacivica.net 

Cities and towns in Friuli-Venezia Giulia
Italian fascist internment camps in Italy
World War II crimes
World War II sites in Italy